Kermia granosa is a species of sea snail, a marine gastropod mollusk in the family Raphitomidae.

Description
The length of the shell attains 6 mm.

The color of the shell is cinereous, with four or five revolving brown lines on the upper whorls and three near the base. The shell contains twelve ribs, rather stout. Tnterstices show small transverse ridges, which form nodules on the ribs. The sinus is large, rounded. The peristome is 6-7 toothed within.

Distribution

References

 Dunker, G. 1871. Mollusca nova Musei Godeffroy Hamburgensis. Malakozoologische Blätter 18: 150–175
 Paetel, F. 1888–1890. Catalog der Conchylien-Sammlung, mit Hinzufügung der bis jetzt publicirtne recenten Arten, sowie der ermittelten Synonyma. Berlin : Paetel.
 Bouge, L.J. & Dautzenberg, P.L. 1914. Les Pleurotomides de la Nouvelle-Caledonie et de ses dependances. Journal de Conchyliologie 61: 123–214
 Richard, G. 1985. Mollusca. Anonymous (Eds.) French Polynesian Coral Reefs, Reef Knowledge and Field Guides. Fauna and Flora. Proceedings of the Fifth International Coral Reef Congress, tahiti, 27 May-1 June, 1985. Antenne Museum-Ephe, Morea, Tahiti, 1. pp. 412-445
 Liu J.Y. [Ruiyu] (ed.). (2008). Checklist of marine biota of China seas. China Science Press. 1267 pp
 Zhenguo, Z. 1995. Studies on micromolluscan Turridae of Lüdao Islet, Taiwan. Studia Marina Sinica 36: 273–296, 5 pls

External links
 MNHN, Paris: specimen
 Tröndlé, J. E. A. N., and Michel Boutet. "Inventory of marine molluscs of French Polynesia." Atoll Research Bulletin (2009)
 
 Gastropods.com: Kermia granosa
 ANSP: Pseudaphnella granosa

granosa
Gastropods described in 1871